The 2007 Football Championship of Zaporizhia Oblast was won by Illich Osypenko.

League table

 Dynamo Zaporizhia withdrew from competitions after the first half

References

Football
Zaporizhia
Zaporizhia